The 2004–05 BBL season was the 18th campaign in the history of the British Basketball League, which commenced on 2 October 2004, and ended with Newcastle Eagles' win in the Play-off Final on 1 May 2005. Eagles won their first piece of silverware in 13 years with victories in the play-offs and the BBL Trophy, against Brighton Bears on their home court at The Brighton Centre.

The League saw the addition of a new franchise for the first time in eight years – when Edinburgh Rocks joined in 1998 – with Plymouth Raiders stepping up from the English Basketball League Division 1.

Teams

Notable occurrences 
 Following the withdrawal of major sponsor, Brighton Bears pulled out of the FIBA Europe League just weeks before the start of the tournament, meaning that no British teams would be competing in European competition for the current season.
 Plymouth Raiders played, and won, their first game in the BBL on 2 October 2004, beating the visiting Milton Keynes Lions in a low-scoring game that finished 63–46 in favour of the rookies.
 The first piece of silverware up for gabs, the BBL Cup, was won by Brighton Bears after defeating Scottish Rocks, 90–74 in the final at the National Indoor Arena, in Birmingham.
 Newcastle Eagles won their first title in 13 years after upsetting Brighton in the BBL Trophy Final, which was played at The Brighton Centre. Eagles ran out 85–60 winners in a very one-sided spectacle.
 Leicester Riders moved back to the city of Leicester after securing a venue and sponsorship with De Montfort University.

BBL championship (Tier 1)

Final standings

The play-offs

Quarter-finals

Semi-finals

Final

EBL National League Division 1 (Tier 2)

Final standings

EBL National League Division 2 (Tier 3)

Final standings

BBL Cup

First round

Semi-finals

Final

BBL Trophy

Group stage 

Northern Group 1

Southern Group 1

Northern Group 2

Southern Group 2

Semi-finals

Final

Statistics leaders

References 

British Basketball League seasons
1
British